The Brisbane Second Division Rugby League is the second division of rugby league clubs in Brisbane.

History
In 1971 the Brisbane Rugby League began a second division competition. This competition was for Under 23 teams in three grades, and was contested by the BRL clubs, University, Teachers and eight "satellite" clubs. By 1977 there were 15 teams competing in Northern and Southern Zones. Since  1981 the Second Division has used Davies Park, West End as its headquarters and finals venue.

There are four teams from 1971 that are still competing in the Second Division: Brighton, St Brendans, Sunnybank and Bulimba Valleys (formerly Valley United Stars). The most successful clubs between 1977 and 2004 have been Sunnybank (13 Premierships), Carina (12 premierships), St Brendans (10) and Banyo (8).

In 2007 there were 65 teams from 43 clubs playing in five open grade competitions, an Under 22 and an Under 20 competition. In 2006, there were 2575 registered players in the League. The Brisbane Second Division is one of the biggest Rugby League competitions in the world.

In 2011, there were 81 teams in 9 Divisions from 45 clubs.

2012, again 9 Divisions from 49 clubs forming 80 teams.

2013, 9 Divisions, 46 Clubs 78 teams competing in our competition.

2014, 81 teams, 8 Divisions, 46 Clubs

2015, 73 teams, 8 Divisions from 47 Clubs.

Clubs 
In 2019 the open age Brisbane Second Division has teams in the following divisions:

See also

Rugby League Competitions in Australia
 Brisbane A-Grade Rugby League

External links
Official Site
World of Rugby League - Brisbane Second Division Forum

Rugby league competitions in Queensland
Rugby league in Brisbane
Queensland Rugby League